France competed at the 1936 Summer Olympics in Berlin, Germany. 201 competitors, 190 men and 11 women, took part in 100 events in 18 sports.

It was notable for an incident during the opening ceremonies. During the March of the Nations (when each national team with its flag parades on the field), the entire French team gave a straight-arm salute as it passed the box of Adolf Hitler (head of state of the host country for that Olympics, Germany). The French flag was also dipped in such a way as to drag it in the dirt in front of Hitlers box. There was a storm of protest in France after the incident was reported there, and accusations were made that the French Olympic committee was pro-Nazi. The committee stated that the salute (resembling the salute of Germany's ruling Nazi party) was an 'Olympic salute', and that dipping the colors was a tradition. The incident is recorded in Leni Riefenstahl's 1938 film Olympia.

Medalists

Gold
 Jean Despeaux – Boxing, Men's Middleweight
 Roger Michelot – Boxing, Men's Light Heavyweight
 Robert Charpentier, Jean Goujon, Guy Lapébie, and Roger-Jean Le Nizerhy – Cycling, Men's 4.000m Team Pursuit
 Robert Charpentier – Cycling, Men's Individual Road Race
 Robert Charpentier, Robert Dorgebray, and Guy Lapébie – Cycling, Men's Team Road Race
 Louis Hostin – Weightlifting, Men's Light Heavyweight
 Emile Poilvé – Wrestling, Men's Freestyle Middleweight

Silver
 Henri Eberhardt – Canoeing, Men's F1 10.000m Folding Kayak Singles
 Pierre Georget – Cycling, Men's 1.000m Time Trial
 Guy Lapébie – Cycling, Men's Individual Road Race
 Gérard de Ballorre, Daniel Gillois, and André Jousseaume – Equestrian, Dressage Team
 Edward Gardère – Fencing, Men's Foil Individual
 René Bondoux, René Bougnol, Jaques Coutrot, André Gardère, Edward Gardère, and René Lemoine – Fencing, Men's Foil Team

Bronze
 Louis Chaillot – Cycling, Men's 1.000m Sprint (Scratch)
 Pierre Georget and Georges Maton – Cycling, Men's 2.000m Tandem
 Georges Buchard, Philippe Cattiau, Henri Dulieux, Michel Pécheux, Bernard Schmetz, and Paul Wormser – Fencing, Men's Épée Team
 Marceau Fourcade, Georges Tapie, and Noël Vandernotte – Rowing, Men's Coxed Pairs
 Marcel Chauvigné, Marcel Cosmat, Fernand Vandernotte, Marcel Vandernotte, and Noël Vandernotte – Rowing, Men's Coxed Fours
 Charles des Jammonières – Shooting, Men's Free Pistol

Athletics

Basketball

Boxing

Canoeing

Cycling

Eight cyclists, all men, represented France in 1936.

Individual road race
 Robert Charpentier
 Guy Lapébie
 Robert Dorgebray
 Jean Goujon

Team road race
 Robert Charpentier
 Guy Lapébie
 Robert Dorgebray
 Jean Goujon

Sprint
 Louis Chaillot

Time trial
 Pierre Georget

Tandem
 Pierre Georget
 Georges Maton

Team pursuit
 Robert Charpentier
 Jean Goujon
 Guy Lapébie
 Roger Le Nizerhy

Diving

Equestrian

Fencing

19 fencers, 16 men and 3 women, represented France in 1936.

Men's foil
 Edward Gardère
 André Gardère
 René Lemoine

Men's team foil
 André Gardère, Edward Gardère, René Lemoine, René Bondoux, Jacques Coutrot, René Bougnol

Men's épée
 Michel Pécheux
 Henri Dulieux

Men's team épée
 Philippe Cattiau, Bernard Schmetz, Georges Buchard, Michel Pécheux, Henri Dulieux, Paul Wormser

Men's sabre
 Marcel Faure
 Edward Gardère
 Jean Piot

Men's team sabre
 Marcel Faure, Maurice Gramain, Edward Gardère, Jean Piot, Roger Barisien, André Gardère

Women's foil
 Agathe Turgis
 Marguerite Reuche
 Andrée Boisson

Field hockey

Men's team competition
Preliminary Round (Group C)
 Lost to the Netherlands (1-3)
 Defeated Switzerland (1-0)
 Drew with Belgium (2-2)
Semi Finals
 Lost to India (0-10)
Final
 Lost to the Netherlands (3-4) → Fourth Place

Gymnastics

Modern pentathlon

Three male pentathletes represented France in 1936.

 André Chrétien
 Béchir Bouazzat
 Paul Lavanga

Rowing

France had 19 rowers participate in five out of seven rowing events in 1936.

 Men's single sculls
 Henri Banos

 Men's double sculls
 André Giriat
 Robert Jacquet

 Men's coxed pair
 Georges Tapie
 Marceau Fourcade
 Noël Vandernotte (cox)

 Men's coxed four
 Fernand Vandernotte
 Marcel Vandernotte
 Jean Cosmat
 Marcel Chauvigné
 Noël Vandernotte (cox)

 Men's eight
 Émile Lecuirot
 Louis Devillié
 Henri Souharce
 Alphonse Bouton
 Camille Becanne
 Bernard Batillat
 Jean Cottez
 Marcel Charletoux
 Claude Lowenstein (cox)

Sailing

Shooting

Eight shooters represented France in 1936. Charles des Jammonières won a bronze medal in the 50 m pistol event.

25 m rapid fire pistol
 Élie Monnier
 Charles des Jammonières
 Édouard Lambert

50 m pistol
 Charles des Jammonières
 Marcel Bonin
 René Koch

50 m rifle, prone
 Jacques Mazoyer
 Raymond Durand
 Marcel Fitoussi

Swimming

Water polo

Weightlifting

Wrestling

References

External links
Official Olympic Reports
International Olympic Committee results database

Nations at the 1936 Summer Olympics
1936
Summer Olympics